Waist clothes, also called armings or fights, were colored clothes or sheets, usually red, that were hung around the outside of a ship's upper works, fore and aft, and before the cubbridge heads. They were used as an adornment during ceremonious occasions, and served as a visual screen during times of action, to protect the men aboard. They were sometimes also hung around the tops, in which case they were called top armings.

References
 
Webster's 1828 Dictionary
Mainwaring. The Seaman's Dictionary. (c. 1644) 

Nautical terminology